is a stratovolcano located in the Tokachi Volcanic Group, Hokkaidō, Japan. The mountain sits between the larger Mount Tokachi to the southwest and shorter Biei Fuji to the northeast. It forms part of the border between Shintoku and Biei towns.

Geology
The mountain consists of mostly non-alkaline mafic rock from the middle Pleistocene.

History
On July 16, 2009, a 64-year-old man died of exposure on Mount Biei, while five other members of his party had to be rescued. At the same time on nearby Mount Tomuraushi, eight members of an adventure tour group were also killed by exposure and a lone hiker was found dead one day later.

See also
List of volcanoes in Japan
List of mountains in Japan

References

Biei
Biei, Hokkaido